Nashawena Island is the second largest of the Elizabeth Islands of Dukes County, Massachusetts, United States. It lies between Cuttyhunk Island to the west and Pasque Island to the east. The island is part of the town of Gosnold, Massachusetts. Nashawena is an Indian word meaning "middle island". Rock Island and Baret Island are two small islands located north of Nashawena.

References

Elizabeth Islands
Coastal islands of Massachusetts
Populated coastal places in Massachusetts